Shark Island is a small peninsula adjacent to the coastal city of Lüderitz in Namibia. Formerly an island, it became a peninsula from 1906 on by the creation of a wide land connection that doubled its former size.

It had been formerly named Star Island by British Captain Alexander during his 1795 surveying expedition.

Concentration camp

The island was site of Shark Island death camp. It was Namibia's first large-scale death camp. Close to 1,800 Nama prisoners arrived in September 1906, including Cornelius Frederiks, one of the strongest Nama military leaders.

Shark Island has been called the "blueprint" for what the Nazis did later. Long before Hitler or the Nazis, the Germans shipped the Nama people to a remote location, where they performed experiments on the Nama and worked them to death.

References

External links 
 Travel guide

Peninsulas of Africa
Former islands
Lüderitz
Coasts of Namibia